St. Mary's Assumption Church is a National Historic Landmark church at Constance and Josephine Streets in New Orleans, Louisiana, U.S. The church was completed in 1860, built for the swelling German Catholic immigrant population in the Lower Garden District section of the city (the church across the street, Saint Alphonsus Church, was built at the same time for the swelling Irish Catholic immigrant population in the same area). Both churches are extremely beautiful and ornate.

Description
St.  Mary's  Assumption is home to a shrine and museum for Blessed Francis Xavier Seelos, a German priest who came to the United States to minister to German-speaking immigrants. Fr. Seelos died while serving as the pastor at St. Mary's Assumption:  after visiting and caring for the victims of yellow fever, he succumbed to the disease himself in 1867. In recognition of his virtuous life, Fr. Seelos was beatified by the Roman Catholic Church in 2000.

It was declared a National Historic Landmark in 1974, significant as a rare and elaborate example German Baroque Revival architecture.

In 1965, the church was heavily damaged by Hurricane Betsy, which resulted in the church being temporarily closed, and almost resulted in the church being demolished. In 2005, Hurricane Katrina caused heavy rain and wind damage, and water infiltration damaged interior plaster and ceiling, according to the National Park Service.

Best-selling novelist Anne Rice had her marriage convalidated at St. Mary's Assumption with her husband Stan. In addition, Anne Rice included the church in her fictional work. For example, in The Witching Hour, two of the main characters, Rowan and Michael, were married at St. Mary's Assumption. Also, in Blackwood Farm, the church is the setting of Aunt Queen's funeral. In 2005, Rice added text and pictures on her website that encouraged donations to St. Mary's Assumption to help repair the damage caused by Hurricane Katrina.

The church has two pipe organs.  The grand organ in the 2nd balcony was constructed in 1861 by the firm of Simmons & Willcox of Boston.  It was rebuilt with new tubular pneumatic chests in 1900 by William Schuelke.  It was partially electrified ca. 1920.  The choir organ was constructed by Pels & VanLeeuwen of Alkmaar, The Netherlands, in 1971 for the chapel of First Presbyterian Church of Royal Oak, MI, as that firm's Op. 775.  It was relocated to St. Mary's Assumption Church in 2015 by Redman Organ Co. of Forth Worth, TX, with the assistance of Renaissance Pipe Organ Co. of Ann Arbor, MI.

See also
List of National Historic Landmarks in Louisiana
National Register of Historic Places listings in Orleans Parish, Louisiana

References

External links
 Seelos Shrine - information about St. Mary's Assumption Church, Seelos Shrine and Museum

German-American culture in Louisiana
National Historic Landmarks in Louisiana
Roman Catholic churches completed in 1860
Churches on the National Register of Historic Places in Louisiana
Roman Catholic churches in New Orleans
Baroque Revival architecture in the United States
Redemptorist churches in the United States
1860 establishments in Louisiana
Museums in New Orleans
Religious museums in Louisiana
National Register of Historic Places in New Orleans
19th-century Roman Catholic church buildings in the United States